Basma and its variant Basmah are Arabic words which are used as a feminine given name and a surname. Its adjective form means "smile" in Arabic. People with the name include:

Given name
 Basma Abdel Aziz (born 1976), Egyptian psychiatrist and human rights activist
 Basma Khalfaoui (born 1970), Tunisian lawyer and political activist 
 Basmah bint Saud Al Saud (born 1964), Saudi royal
 Basma bint Talal (born 1951), Jordanian royal

Surname
 Christer Basma (born 1972), Norwegian football player
 Kassim Basma (born 1960), Sierra Leonean businessman
 Muhsen Basma (born 1966), Syrian football referee

References

Arabic feminine given names
Arabic-language surnames